The Torlesse Islands are an archipelago in the Solomon Sea. Politically they belong to Milne Bay Province in the southeastern region of Papua New Guinea. They are 13 km away from Misima and 5 km west of Deboyne Islands. The aggregate land area of the seven islands is 2.08 km2. The main village is Tinolan.
it is inhabited by a family from Panaeati Island who grow Copra.

References

Archipelagoes of Papua New Guinea
Islands of Milne Bay Province
Louisiade Archipelago